Jangalpara is a census town in Chanditala I CD Block in Srirampore subdivision of Hooghly district in the state of West Bengal, India.

Geography

Location
Jangalpara is located at: 

It is 28 km from District headquarters Hooghly.

Gangadharpur, Manirampur, Masat, Jangalpara, Dudhkalmi, Nababpur, Bhagabatipur, Kumirmora and Ramanathpur form a cluster of census towns in Chanditala I CD Block.

Urbanisation
Srirampore subdivision is the most urbanized of the subdivisions in Hooghly district. 73.13% of the population in the subdivision is urban and 26.88% is rural. The subdivision has 6 municipalities and 34 census towns. The municipalities are: Uttarpara Kotrung Municipality, Konnagar Municipality, Serampore Municipality, Baidyabati Municipality, Rishra Municipality and Dankuni Municipality. Amongst the CD Blocks in the subdivision, Uttarapara Serampore (census towns shown in a separate map) had 76% urban population, Chanditala I 42%, Chanditala II 69% and Jangipara 7% (census towns shown in the map above). All places marked in the map are linked in the larger full screen map.

Gram panchayat
Villages and census towns in Krishnarampur gram panchayat are: Krishnarampur and Jangalpara.

Demographics
As per 2011 Census of India, Jangalpara had a total population of 7,478 of which 3,752 (50%) were males and 3,726 (50%) were females. Population below 6 years was 724. The total number of literates in Jangalpara was 5,736 (84.93% of the population over 6 years).

Transport
 Railway
Baruipara railway station its nearest railway station on Howrah-Bardhaman chord, which is a part of the Kolkata Suburban Railway system.
 Road
The main road is SH 15 (Ahilyabai Holkar Road). It is the main artery of the town and it is connected to NH 19 (old numbering NH 2)/Durgapur Expressway.
 Bus

Private Bus 
 26 Bonhooghly - Champadanga
 26A Serampore - Aushbati
 26C Bonhooghly - Jagatballavpur

Bus Routes without Numbers 
 Howrah Station - Bandar (Dhanyaghori)

Education
Jangalpara Krishnarampur Deshapran High School

Jangalpara Krishnarampur Deshapran High School is a coeducational higher secondary school at PO Jangalpara Bazar. It has facilities for teaching Bengali, English, Sanskrit, Arabic, history, philosophy, economics, geography, mathematics, physics, chemistry and bio-science.

Healthcare
Jangalpara has a Primary Health Centre with 6 beds.

References

Census towns in Chanditala I CD Block